Waltherhornia speculifera is a species of beetles in the family Cicindelidae, the only species in the genus Waltherhornia.

References

Cicindelidae